Siegfried "Sigi" Denk (10 February 1951 – 5 March 1982) was an Austrian cyclist. He competed in the team time trial at the 1972 Summer Olympics. He won the Austrian National Road Race Championships in 1971 and 1974. Dink committed suicide by hanging in 1982.

References

External links
 

1951 births
1982 suicides
Austrian male cyclists
Olympic cyclists of Austria
Cyclists at the 1972 Summer Olympics
People from Braunau am Inn
Sportspeople from Upper Austria
Suicides by hanging in Austria